Tingena epichalca is a species of moth in the family Oecophoridae. It is endemic to New Zealand and has been observed at Arthur's Pass and in the mountains around Otira. This species is very similar in appearance to Tingena aphrontis but can be distinguished on the basis of different antennal ciliations of the male of the species. Adults are on the wing in January and inhabit alpine zones, frequenting alpine vegetation on the edge of screes at altitudes of between 3 – 4000 ft.

Taxonomy 
This species was originally described by Edward Meyrick in 1886 using specimens collected at Arthur's Pass in January and named Cremnogenes epichalca. In 1915 Meyrick discussed this species under the name Borkhausenia epichalca. In 1926 Alfred Philpott discussed and illustrated the genitalia of the male of this species. In 1928 George Hudson also discussed and illustrated this species in his book The butterflies and moths of New Zealand. In 1988 J. S. Dugdale placed this species within the genus Tingena. The male lectotype is held at the Natural History Museum, London.

Description

Meyrick described this species as follows:

This species is very similar in appearance to Tingena aphrontis but can be distinguished on the basis of different antennal ciliations of the male of the species. The species varies in depth of colouration.

Distribution 
This species is endemic to New Zealand and has been observed at its type locality of Arthur's Pass. It has also been observed in the mountains around Otira at altitudes of approximately 3000 ft.

Behaviour 
The adults of this species are on the wing in January.

Habitat 
This species inhabits alpine zones and is associated with alpine vegetation on the boarder of scree slopes at altitudes of between 3000 and 4000 ft.

References

Oecophoridae
Moths of New Zealand
Moths described in 1886
Endemic fauna of New Zealand
Taxa named by Edward Meyrick
Endemic moths of New Zealand